Roderick Dwayne Higgins (born January 31, 1960) is an American former professional basketball player who formerly served as president of basketball operations for the National Basketball Association's Charlotte Hornets. He is also the father of former Charlotte Bobcats point guard Cory Higgins.

A 6'7" forward from California State University, Fresno, Higgins played 13 seasons (1982–1994) in the NBA as a member of the Chicago Bulls, the Seattle SuperSonics, the San Antonio Spurs, the New Jersey Nets, the Golden State Warriors, the Sacramento Kings, and the Cleveland Cavaliers. He averaged 9 points per game and 3.6 rebounds per game during his NBA career. After his playing career ended Higgins served as an assistant coach with the Warriors until 2000 when he was named assistant general manager of the Washington Wizards. He was re-hired by the Warriors on May 20, 2004 joining former teammate Chris Mullin in the team's front office.

On May 31, 2007, he was hired as the second general manager of the Charlotte Hornets (then the Charlotte Bobcats), replacing Bernie Bickerstaff. In 2011, he became the team's president of basketball operations after Rich Cho was hired as general manager. On June 13, 2014, Higgins stepped down as President of Basketball Operations for the Charlotte Hornets.

Higgins also holds a distinct NBA record for playing for the most teams in one season with 4. In the 1985–86 season he played for the Seattle Supersonics, the San Antonio Spurs, the New Jersey Nets, and the Chicago Bulls.

NBA GM record

References

External links
Career stats at https://www.basketball-reference.com
"Warriors Name Rod Higgins General Manager", article from http://www.nba.com/warriors
2005–2006 REPORT CARD: Chris Mullin & Rod Higgins (Golden State of Mind)

1960 births
Living people
African-American basketball players
African-American sports executives and administrators
American sports executives and administrators
American men's basketball players
Basketball players from Louisiana
Centers (basketball)
Charlotte Bobcats executives
Charlotte Hornets executives
Chicago Bulls draft picks
Chicago Bulls players
Cleveland Cavaliers players
Fresno State Bulldogs men's basketball players
Golden State Warriors assistant coaches
Golden State Warriors players
National Basketball Association general managers
New Jersey Nets players
Power forwards (basketball)
Sacramento Kings players
San Antonio Spurs players
Seattle SuperSonics players
Small forwards
Sportspeople from Monroe, Louisiana
Tampa Bay Thrillers players
Washington Wizards executives
21st-century African-American people
20th-century African-American sportspeople